Karen Stemmle (born 27 January 1964) is a Canadian former alpine skier who competed in the 1984 Winter Olympics. She raced on the World Cup Alpine Ski Circuit for 5 years with her best finishes being a 4th place in Verbier, Switzerland and a 4th place in Sunshine, Alberta, Canada. Karen had 5 top 10 World Cup finished in her career and finished 11th overall in the Downhill standings in 1985. Karen's younger brother, Brian Stemmle, competed in 4 Olympics between 1988 and 1998. Karen was proudly inducted into the Aurora Sports Hall Of Fame in 2016.

References

1964 births
Living people
Canadian female alpine skiers
Olympic alpine skiers of Canada
Alpine skiers at the 1984 Winter Olympics